Wiśniew  is a village in the administrative district of Gmina Jakubów, within Mińsk County, Masovian Voivodeship, in east-central Poland.

References

Villages in Mińsk County